Erasmus Dryden may refer to:

Sir Erasmus Dryden, 1st Baronet (died 1632), MP for Banbury
Erasmus Dryden, son of the above and father of the poet John Dryden
Sir Erasmus Henry Dryden, 5th Baronet (1669–1710), English Roman Catholic priest
Sir Erasmus Dryden, 5th Baronet, of the Dryden baronets
Sir Erasmus Dryden, 8th Baronet, of the Dryden baronets